The Ministry of Information and Broadcasting (abbreviated as MoIB) is a branch of the Government of Bangladesh and is the apex body for formulation and administration of the rules and regulations and laws relating to information, broadcasting, the press and films in Bangladesh. It is responsible for releasing government information, media galleries, public domain and government unclassified non-scientific data to the public and international communities.

The Ministry is responsible for all the press and broadcasting arm of the Bangladesh Government. The Bangladesh Film Censor Board is the other important body under this ministry being responsible for the regulation of motion pictures shown in Bangladesh. The current  Minister of Information and Broadcasting is Muhammad Hasan Mahmud.

Organisation
There are 14 agencies and departments under the Ministry of Information and Broadcasting of Bangladesh. They are as follows:

 Information Commission (Information)
 Department of Press Information 
 Press Institute of Bangladesh
 Bangladesh Sangbad Sanstha
 Bangladesh Press Council
 Directorate of Mass Communication (Broadcasting)
 National Institute of Mass Communication
 Bangladesh Television
 Bangladesh Betar
 Department of Films & Publications (Films)
 Bangladesh Film and Television Institute
 Bangladesh Film Development Corporation
 Bangladesh Film Censor Board
 Bangladesh Film Archive

See also 
 Media of Bangladesh
Bangladesh Journalists Welfare Trust

References

External links 
 

Mass media in Bangladesh
Education
Information ministries